Time Flies is the fourth studio album from New Zealand singer-songwriter Ladyhawke. The album was released on 19 November 2021 by Mid Century Records with distribution by BMG.

Background
Soon after the release of her 2016 album Wild Things, Ladyhawke moved back to her native New Zealand from Los Angeles. In the interim, Ladyhawke married and gave birth to her daughter, Billie Jean. Months after giving birth, Ladyhawke suffered from postpartum depression and was subsequently diagnosed with melanoma. Ladyhawke sought treatment for both and recovered before recording Time Flies. To celebrate the album's release, Ladyhawke released a limited edition Game Boy cartridge. The game takes Ladyhawke on a quest to complete the album.

Reception

Time Flies received generally favorable reviews from music critics. At Metacritic, which assigns a normalised rating out of 100 to reviews from professional critics, the album received a weighted average score of 70, based on four reviews.

In a review for AllMusic, critic reviewer Heather Phares wrote: "Shaped by her anxiety and postpartum depression - and the treatment she sought for both - Brown's fourth album uses a light touch when it comes to potentially heavy emotions. Time Flies sparkly grab bag of sounds underscores that she never makes music strictly by the numbers."

Track listing
All credits are listed from Apple Music.

Personnel
Credits adapted from the liner notes of Time Flies.

 Pip Brown – vocals
 Tommy English, Josh Fountain – producer
 Jeremy Toy – mixer
 Dave Cooley – mastering
 Sarah Larnach – artwork direction & design
 Lula Cucchiara – album cover and sleeve photography

References 

2021 albums
Ladyhawke (musician) albums